The Eritrea national basketball team represents the Eritrea in international competitions.

It is administered by the Eritrean National Basketball Federation.

References

Men's national basketball teams
National sports teams of Eritrea
Basketball in Eritrea